Giovanni Antonio Amedeo Plana (6 November 1781 – 20 January 1864) was an Italian astronomer and mathematician. He is considered one of the premiere Italian scientists of his age.

The crater Plana on the Moon is named in his honor.

Biography
Plana was born in Voghera, Italy to Antonio Maria Plana and Giovanna Giacoboni. At the age of 15 he was sent to live with his uncles in Grenoble to complete his education. In 1800 he entered the École Polytechnique, and was one of the students of Joseph-Louis Lagrange. Joseph Fourier, impressed by Plana's abilities, managed to have him appointed to the chair of mathematics in a school of artillery in Piedmont in 1803, which came under the control of the French in 1805. In 1811 he was appointed to the chair of astronomy at the University of Turin thanks to the influence of Lagrange. He spent the remainder of his life teaching at that institution.

Plana's contributions included work on the motions of the Moon, as well as integrals, (including the Abel–Plana formula), elliptic functions, heat, electrostatics, and geodesy. In 1820 he was one of the winners of a prize awarded by the Académie des Sciences in Paris based on the construction of lunar tables using the law of gravity. In 1832 he published the Théorie du mouvement de la lune, the same year he was elected a Foreign Honorary Member of the American Academy of Arts and Sciences. In 1834 he was awarded with the Copley Medal by the Royal Society for his studies on lunar motion. Charles Babbage visited Turin in 1840 at the invitation of Giovanni Plana. Plana became astronomer royal, and then in 1844 a Baron. At the age of 80 he was granted membership in the prestigious Académie des Sciences. He died in Turin.

Works

References

External links
Biography and a source for this page.

1781 births
1864 deaths
Academic staff of the University of Turin
People from Voghera
19th-century Italian astronomers
Italian geodesists
Recipients of the Gold Medal of the Royal Astronomical Society
Recipients of the Copley Medal
Members of the French Academy of Sciences
Members of the Prussian Academy of Sciences
Fellows of the American Academy of Arts and Sciences
Foreign associates of the National Academy of Sciences
Foreign Members of the Royal Society
Corresponding members of the Saint Petersburg Academy of Sciences
Recipients of the Lalande Prize
École Polytechnique alumni